Christopher Martin (born 23 December 1945) is a Canadian bobsledder. He competed in the four man event at the 1976 Winter Olympics.

References

1945 births
Living people
Canadian male bobsledders
Olympic bobsledders of Canada
Bobsledders at the 1976 Winter Olympics
Sportspeople from Montreal